Maria Sergeevna Zharkova (born 7 May 1988) is a Russian former professional tennis player.

Born in Moscow, Zharkova played on tour from 2006 to 2012, reaching a career-high singles ranking of 490 in the world. At the 2011 Baku Cup, she won through to the second qualifying round and made her WTA Tour main-draw debut in the doubles. She won seven doubles titles while competing on the ITF Women's Circuit.

ITF finals

Doubles: 14 (7–7)

References

External links
 
 

1988 births
Living people
Russian female tennis players
Tennis players from Moscow
21st-century Russian women
20th-century Russian women